Cleveland County Training School was a historic school for African-Americans in Shelby, North Carolina. It was included in National Register of Historic Places in 2016.

History 
The school was built in 1895 and it was open until 1957, when it was replaced by newly constructed Hunter Elementary School (on Pinkney Street). However, till 1977, the school educated up to sixth grade. But, in 1985, Christ Temple Apostolic Faith Church purchased the property.

In 2016, Willie Green, a former professional basketball player and current coach of Phoenix Suns purchased the property to establish Carolina Athletic Sports Academy (CASA) - a training facility for the local and national athletes.

Notable alumni 

 Ella Mae Colbert

References 

National Register of Historic Places in Cleveland County, North Carolina
Buildings and structures in Cleveland County, North Carolina
Buildings and structures completed in 1895
Historically segregated African-American schools in North Carolina